Rachel Noble  is the Director-General of the Australian Signals Directorate. She was appointed to the position in February 2020 and is the first woman to hold the position.

Career 
Noble was employed at the Australian Cyber Security Centre and prior to her ASD appointment had spent 20 years working in the public service. 

Prior senior executive roles have included acting as Australia’s first national security CIO within the Department of the Prime Minister and Cabinet, and Deputy chief of the Australia-US satellite tracking facility at Pine Gap in the Northern Territory. She is also a former National Director of Intelligence and Chief Information Officer at the Australian Customs and Border Protection Service and Assistant secretary of governance, responsible for the overall governance and assurance framework for the Department of Defence.

References 

Year of birth missing (living people)
Living people
Australian public servants
Recipients of the Public Service Medal (Australia)